The Broad Fourteens is an area of the southern North Sea that is fairly consistently  deep. Thus, on a nautical chart with depths given in fathoms, a broad area with many "14" notations can be seen.

Extent 
The Broad Fourteens region is located off the coast of the Netherlands and south of the Dogger Bank, roughly between longitude 3°E and 4°30'E and latitude 52°30'N and 53°30'N. The area is known to the Dutch and German navies as the Breeveertien. Geologically it is comparable to the Long Forties, another submerged plateau that has related origins.

Naval battles 
Naval engagements in the region have included the torpedoing of three British cruisers in the action of 22 September 1914.

Navigation 
The shallowness of this area means that the largest oil tankers when fully loaded cannot traverse the Broad Fourteens to reach the English Channel from the North Sea because their draft is too deep.

See also
 Dogger Bank for map and links to similar places

References

Geography of Europe